Norbert Geis (born January 13, 1939 in Großwallstadt, Bavaria) is a German politician. He is a member of the Christian Social Union of Bavaria (CSU).

Life

Geis studied Philosophy, Theology and Law at the Universities of Freiburg and Würzburg. Since 1970 he has worked as a freelancing lawyer in Aschaffenburg.

In 1967 Geis joined the Junge Union and the CSU. Since 1972 he has been chairman of the CSU in the administrative district of Aschaffenburg.

From 1981 to 1986 he was a member of the  Bavarian Landtag. In 1987 Geis was elected directly into the Bundestag by winning in the electoral district of Aschaffenburg. He defended his direct mandate at the following federal elections. His work for his district has been extremely well received by his constituency, leading to his constantly achieving a higher vote than his party. At the 2009 elections he gained 42,8% of the votes.

Political views

Geis belongs to the conservative wing of his party, especially on social and legal issues.

He also defended the former CDU member Martin Hohmann, who was expelled after a controversial a speech, stating he has been misunderstood.

In 2003 he called for a "tougher treatment" during interrogations by the police. He said that it had to be possible to threaten somebody with violence, if a human life could be saved in that way. This was in response to an incident involving the deputy police chief of Frankfurt Wolfgang Daschner, who had threatened a child kidnapper with violence and, following that, had been given a suspended sentence.

External links
Official Website

1939 births
Living people
People from Miltenberg (district)
Members of the Bundestag for Bavaria
University of Freiburg alumni
University of Würzburg alumni
Members of the Landtag of Bavaria
Members of the Bundestag 2009–2013
Members of the Bundestag 2005–2009
Members of the Bundestag 2002–2005
Members of the Bundestag 1998–2002
Members of the Bundestag 1994–1998
Members of the Bundestag for the Christian Social Union in Bavaria